Xiamen Yarui Optical Co., Ltd, doing business as Bolon ( and Molsion, is a Chinese eyewear manufacturer. The company is headquartered in Xiamen.

Xiamen Yarui Optical is one of the world's largest eyeglasses manufacturers, and Bolon is China's largest eyewear brand.  The company has expanded beyond its core market of China to Singapore and other markets in Asia and Europe.  EssilorLuxottica acquired a 50% stake in 2013.

References

External links 

Chinese companies established in 2004
Eyewear companies of China
Manufacturing companies based in Xiamen
Optics manufacturing companies